Catgut (also known as gut) is a type of cord that is prepared from the natural fiber found in the walls of animal intestines. Catgut makers usually use sheep or goat intestines, but occasionally use the intestines of cattle, hogs, horses, mules, or donkeys. Despite the name, catgut is not made from cat intestines.

Etymology
The word catgut may have been an abbreviation of the word "cattlegut".  Alternatively, it may derive by folk etymology from kitgut or kitstring — the dialectal word kit, meaning fiddle, having at some point been confused with the word kit for a young cat, the word "kit" being possibly derived from Welsh.

Common uses

Stringed instruments
For a long time, catgut was the most common material for the strings of harps, lutes, violins, violas, cellos, and double basses,  acoustic guitars and other stringed musical instruments, as well as older marching snare drums.  Most musical instruments produced today use strings with cores made of other materials, generally steel or synthetic polymer. Gut strings are the natural choice for many classical and baroque string players, and gut strings are still most commonly preferred in concert-tension pedal/grand and some lever harps because they give a richer, darker sound as well as withstanding high tension within low alto, tenor, and high-bass ranges. Many acoustic guitarists moved away from gut strings in the early 1900s when the C. F. Martin & Company introduced steel strings, which gave greater volume to the guitar. "The demand for steel came from ensemble players, who couldn't make themselves heard clearly without it." Within a few years the majority of Martin guitars were made with steel strings to accommodate the demand. After World War II, most classical and flamenco guitarists switched from catgut to the new nylon strings for their greater smoothness, durability, and stability of intonation.

Before 1900, the best strings for musical instruments were reputedly from Italy. Musicians believed the best were from Naples, though Rome and other Italian cities also produced excellent strings. Today high quality gut strings are produced mostly in Italy, Germany, and the United States. They are also made elsewhere, for example in India and Morocco, for local use.

Sutures
Catgut suture was once a widely used material in surgical settings. Catgut sutures remain in use in developing countries where they are locally less expensive and easier to obtain. Catgut treated with chromium salts, known as chromic catgut, is also used in surgery.

Tennis racquets
Natural gut is still used as a high-performance string in tennis racquets, although it had more popularity in the past and is being displaced by synthetic strings.

Clocks
Catgut is also traditionally used to hang the weights in grandfather clocks.

Watches
Catgut was also used in early pocket timepieces from their invention up until the use of Fusee chains.

Production
To prepare catgut, workers clean the small intestines, free them from any fat, and steep them in water. Then they scrape off the external membrane with a blunt knife, and steep the intestines again for some time in potassium hydroxide. Then they smooth and equalize the intestines by drawing them out. Lean animals yield the toughest gut.  Next, they twist the prepared gut strands together to make string. String diameter is determined by the thickness of the individual guts, and by the number used. A thin string, such as a violin E, uses only three or four guts, whereas a double bass string may use twenty or more. After twisting and drying, workers polish the strings to the required diameter.

Before the twentieth century, the strings were simply rubbed with an abrasive to smooth them. Today they are generally ground down to the desired diameter using a centerless grinder.  After drying and polishing, workers bleach and disinfect the strings using sulfur dioxide, dye them if necessary, and sort them into sizes.

Catgut sutures are normally treated with a chromium salt solution to resist body enzymes, to slow the absorption process, and are called catgut chromic sutures—whereas untreated catgut sutures are called catgut plain sutures.

References

External links 

Animal products
Surgical suture material